Zabrus rotundatus is a species of ground beetle in the Iberozabrus subgenus that is endemic to Spain.

References

Beetles described in 1838
Beetles of Europe
Endemic fauna of Spain
Zabrus